Mrugathrushna is a 1990 Telugu feature film directed by P. Sambasiva Rao, with Revathi in the lead role, The film is about an inspiring journey of a lower class woman. The film was premiered at the International Film Festival of India.

Awards
Nandi Awards

References

1990 films
1990s Telugu-language films